Jamwal is a toponymic surname for a Dogra Rajput clan of the same name from Jammu, in Jammu and Kashmir, India. They claim descent from the traditional founder of Jammu, Jambu Lochan, and there at one time some of their members were rulers of the princely state of Jammu and Kashmir, often referred to as the Dogra dynasty.

Notable people
 Maharaja Gulab Singh Jamwal
 Maharaja Hari Singh 
 Maharaja Pratap Singh of Jammu and Kashmir
 Maharaja Ranbir Singh
 Yuvraj Karan Singh
 Yuvraj Vikramaditya Singh
 Brigadier Rajinder Singh
 Ayush Jamwal, Indian cricketer
 Narsingh Dev Jamwal, Indian writer
 Pratibha Jamwal, Indian Navy officer
 Ranveer Jamwal, Indian Army officer and mountain climber
 Satyendra Singh Jamwal, Indian Navy officer
 Vidyut Jamwal, Indian actor

See also
 Dogras
 Dogri language

References

Rajput clans
Dogra
Dogra people
Social groups of Jammu and Kashmir
Toponymic surnames
Indian surnames
Hindu surnames
Surnames of Indian origin
People from Jammu
People from Jammu (city)
Surnames of Hindustani origin